Goričak is a settlement in the Municipality of Zavrč in the Haloze area of eastern Slovenia, right on the border with Croatia. The area traditionally belonged to the Styria region. It is now included in the Drava Statistical Region.

References

External links
Goričak on Geopedia

Populated places in the Municipality of Zavrč